Zacharias Mellebye (20 December 1781 – 9 November 1854) was a Norwegian farmer and non-commissioned military officer who served as a representative at the  Norwegian Constituent Assembly.

Biography
Zacharias Rasmussen Mellebye was born on Udengen in Skjeberg  parish at Sarpsborg in Østfold, Norway.  He participated  in the military as a non-commissioned officer in both in 1808 and 1814. He was a commander in the Aker Sharpshooter Regiment (Akershusiske skarpskytterregiment). He represented his regiment at the Norwegian Constituent Assembly in 1814. He generally supported the independence party (Selvstendighetspartiet).

Personal life
He was married to Sofie Magnusdatter Begbye (1781- 1872) with whom he had eight children.

References

1781 births
1854 deaths
People from Sarpsborg
Norwegian Army personnel
Norwegian military personnel of the Napoleonic Wars
Fathers of the Constitution of Norway